The Mitsubishi Mirage Dingo is a mini MPV built by Mitsubishi Motors from 1998–2003, using a shortened version of the Mirage platform.

Overview
The "Dingo" name is derived from Bingo and its connotations of good fortune, but with the B replaced by D to represent Mitsubishi's Diamond logo. The "Dingo" name also sourced from a wild dog native to Australia, dingo (Canis lupus dingo). In Japan, it was sold at a specific retail chain called Car Plaza. Exterior and Interior is highly similar to Mitsubishi Dion which is an MPV sold in Japan.

As with most direct competitors in the market segment, accommodation is limited to two rows and five seats. The rear bench is split 50-50, with each section able to be slid forwards or backwards individually. Alternatively, folding or detaching the rear chairs provides a large and flat storage area. The rear seats can also be flipped downward to form a pair of beds. Because the gearshift is column-mounted there is no transmission tunnel, thus enabling occupants to walk between front and rear seats.

Initially available with the 4G15 "Orion" 1.5 L GDI powerplant mated to an INVECS-II 4-speed automatic, a smaller  1.3 L version (without GDI) and a larger 4G93 1.8 L version were introduced with a facelift in 2000, as well as Mitsubishi's INVECS-III continuously variable transmission.

Hafei Saima
In China, the Dingo is license-built and marketed as the Hafei Saima since April 2001.

Annual sales

(Sources: Facts & Figures 2000, Facts & Figures 2005, Mitsubishi Motors website)

References

Dingo
2000s cars
All-wheel-drive vehicles
Front-wheel-drive vehicles

Cars introduced in 1998